Tom Hubbard  (born 1950) was the first librarian of the Scottish Poetry Library and is the author, editor or co-editor of over thirty academic and literary works.

Biography
Tom Hubbard was born in Kirkcaldy.

After obtaining first class honours (MA, PhD) from Aberdeen University and a Diploma in Librarianship from Strathclyde University, Hubbard worked at the Scottish Poetry Library (1984–92) and as a visiting lecturer at the universities of Grenoble, Connecticut, Budapest (Faculty of Sciences of the Eötvös Loránd University), and North Carolina (at Asheville).

From 2000 to 2004, he was editor of BOSLIT (Bibliography of Scottish Literature in Translation), a research project of Edinburgh University, based at the National Library of Scotland. He is also an honorary research fellow in the Department of Scottish Literature, University of Glasgow (2004–2007), an honorary fellow in the School of Literatures, Languages and Cultures, University of Edinburgh (2005–2008), and Fellow of the Chartered Institute of Library and Information Professionals (FCLIP) (elected 2006).

In 2006, Hubbard was Visiting Professor in Scottish Literature and Culture at the University of Budapest (ELTE). Thereafter, he edited the Online Bibliography of Irish Literary Criticism (BILC) at the National University of Ireland, Maynooth (2006–2010) and in December 2009 he was appointed the Lynn Wood Neag Distinguished Visiting Professor of British Literature, University of Connecticut for the Spring Semester of 2011. In 2011/12 Hubbard was Professeur invité at Stendhal University, Grenoble, and a Writer-in-residence at the Château Lavigny in Vaud, Switzerland.

Hubbard is on the editorial board of the journal Scottish Affairs, and an honorary visiting fellow at the University of Edinburgh Institute of Governance, where he is working on a "Scotland and Europe" project with Dr Eberhard Bort.

Bibliography
Revaluation: R.B. Cunninghame Graham, in Murray, Glen (ed.), Cencrastus No. 8, Spring 1982, pp. 27 - 30, 
review of The Scottish Sketches of R.B. Cunninghame Graham, edited by John Walker, in Hearn, Sheila G. (ed.), Cencrastus No. 10, Autumn 1982, p. 42, 
The Lucky Charm of Major Bessop (Grace Note Publications, 2014) 
Poetry of Baudelaire (Critical Insights) (Salem Pr Inc, 2014)  
Parapets and Labyrinths: Poems in English and Scots on European Themes (Grace Note Publications, 2013) 
The Nyaff and Other Poems (Windfall Books, 2012) 
The Chagall Winnocks: Wi Ither Scots Poems and Ballants O Europe (Grace Note Publications, 2011) 
with Ralph Pite, Keith Carabine and Lindy Stiebel, Lives of Victorian Literary Figures: Pt. VII: Joseph Conrad, Henry Rider Haggard and Rudyard Kipling by Their Contemporaries (Pickering & Chatto, 2009) 
with Ralph Pite, Rikky Rooksby and Edward Wakeling Lives of Victorian Literary Figures: Pt. VI: Lewis Carroll, Robert Louis Stevenson and Algernon Charles Swinburne by Their Contemporaries (Pickering & Chatto, 2008) 
Marie B: A Biographical Novel (Kirkcaldy: Ravenscraig Press, 2008) 
with T. S. Law and John Law, At the Pynt o the Pick and Other Poems (Fingerpost Publicatiouns, 2008)  
with Duncan Glen, A Fringe of Gold: The Fife Anthology (Edinburgh: Birlinn, 2008) 
Peacocks and Squirrels: Poems of Fife (Kirkcaldy: Akros Publications, 2007) 
Border Crossings: Twelve Contemporary Writers from Scotland (Scottish PEN, 2007) 
Michael Scot: Myth and Polymath (Akros Publications, 2006)  
with RDS Jack, Scotland in Europe (SCROLL: Scottish Cultural Review of Language & Literature) (Editions Rodopi B.V., 2006)   
with Zsuzsanna Varga, Anthology of Scottish poetry translated into Hungarian (2006)
Scottish Faust: Poems and Ballads of Eldritch Lore (Kettillonia, 2004)  
From Soda Fountain to Moonshine Mountain: American Poems (Akros Publications, 2004)  
with William Soutar and Sheila Cant, A Bairn's Sang and Other Poems (Mercat Press, 1999) 
Isolde's Luve-daith: Poems in English and Scots (Akros Publications, 1998)  
with Thomas Rain Crowe and Gwendal Denez, A Celtic Resurgence: The New Celtic Poetry (Writing the Wind) (New Native Press, 1997)  
Integrative Vision: Poetry and the Visual Arts in Baudelaire, Rilke and MacDiarmid (Akros Publications, 1997) 
Seeking Mr. Hyde: Studies in Robert Louis Stevenson, Symbolism, Myth and the Pre-Modern (Scottish studies) (Peter Lang Publishing, 1995)  
The New Makars: Anthology of Contemporary Poetry in Scots (Edinburgh: Mercat Press, 1991) 
with John Brewster, William Hershaw and Harvey Holton Four Fife Poets: Fower Brigs ti a Kinrik (Aberdeen University Press, 1988)

References

External links
 – Interview with Politico 17 February 2010

1950 births
Living people
People from Kirkcaldy
People educated at Strathallan School
Alumni of the University of Aberdeen
Alumni of the University of Strathclyde
Scottish poets
Scottish scholars and academics
Academic staff of Grenoble Alpes University
University of Connecticut faculty
Academic staff of Eötvös Loránd University
University of North Carolina at Asheville faculty
Academics of  St Patrick's College, Maynooth
Fellows of the Chartered Institute of Library and Information Professionals